Eternal Warrior is Japanese heavy metal band Anthem's fourth studio album since their reformation in the year 2000.

The band released this album after 2 years of intensive touring and planning. Like their previous studio album Overload, this album follows the same aggressive direction.

Track listing 
 "Onslaught" (Shibata) - 5:12
 "Eternal Warrior" (Shibata) - 5:05
 "Soul Cry" (Shibata) - 4:08
 "Life Goes On" (Shibata) - 6:00
 "Let the New Day Come" (Shibata) - 4:49
 "Distress" (Shimizu) - 5:56
 "Bleeding" (Shibata) - 4:05
 "Omega Man" (Shimizu) - 4:05
 "Easy Mother" (Shibata) - 4:40
 "Mind Slide" (Shibata) - 7:03

Personnel

Band members
Eizo Sakamoto - vocals
Akio Shimizu - guitars
Naoto Shibata - bass, producer
Hirotsugu Homma - drums

References

2004 albums
Anthem (band) albums
Victor Entertainment albums